Gökçeören (formerly Terme) is a village in the Cide District, Kastamonu Province, Turkey. Its population is 277 (2021).

References

Villages in Cide District